Giusto Utens or Justus Utens (died 1609) was a Flemish painter who is remembered for the series of Medicean villas in lunette form that he painted for the third Grand Duke of Tuscany, Ferdinando I, in 1599–1602.

He moved to Carrara about 1580, where he married, and where later he returned and died.

Medici villas
The Medici villas illustrated by Utens from a bird's-eye perspective are:
Villa Medici del Trebbio
Villa Medicea di Cafaggiolo
Palazzo Pitti, the Boboli Gardens and Fort Belvedere
Villa Medici di Castello
Villa Medici La Petraia
Villa di Pratolino
Villa Medicea L'Ambrogiana
Villa di Lappeggi
Villa di Poggio a Caiano
Villa di Serravezza
Villa La Magia
Villa Di Marignolle
Villa di Montevettolini
Villa di Colle Salvetti

The three missing lunettes are thought to be the Villa di Artimino and perhaps the Villa Medici di Careggi. In the early twentieth century an anonymous artist completed the scheme, based on eighteenth-century vedute illustrating the villa at Careggi, that at Cerreto Guidi and Villa del Poggio Imperiale, which in the sixteenth century was still the Villa di Poggio Baroncelli.

Location
Of the seventeen Utens paintings, fourteen have survived, and were displayed in the history museum of Florence, the Museo di Firenze com'era, until its closure in 2010. They were transferred in 2014 to a new permanent gallery at Petraia Villa Medici.

Lunettes of the Medicean villas

See also
 
Villa Medici in Fiesole

References

Further reading

16th-century Flemish painters
16th-century Italian painters
Italian male painters
1609 deaths
Year of birth unknown